Gary Dean Plummer (born February 21, 1962) is a retired American professional basketball player, who played in the National Basketball Association.

College career
Plummer, a 6'9" tall power forward-center, played high school basketball at Osborn High School in Detroit, Michigan. After high school, Plummer played college basketball at Boston University, with the Boston Terriers, from 1980 to 1984.

Professional career
Plummer was selected by the Golden State Warriors of the NBA, in the second round, with the 45th overall pick of the 1984 NBA Draft. Plummer played in two NBA seasons. He played with both the Warriors and the Denver Nuggets. In his NBA career, Plummer played in a total of 126 games, in which he scored a total of 531 points.

Plummer also played pro club basketball in Israel, Italy, Spain, and Greece.

Post-playing career
Plummer now runs the N Your Court (NYC) basketball camps and AAU programs.

External links
Player Profile @ ACB.com
Player Profile stat @ Safsal.co.il (Hebrew)

1962 births
Living people
20th-century African-American sportspeople
21st-century African-American people
African-American basketball players
American expatriate basketball people in Argentina
American expatriate basketball people in France
American expatriate basketball people in Greece
American expatriate basketball people in Israel
American expatriate basketball people in Italy
American expatriate basketball people in Peru
American expatriate basketball people in Spain
American men's basketball players
Baloncesto Málaga players
Basket Brescia Leonessa players
Basketball players from Detroit
Boston University Terriers men's basketball players
Centers (basketball)
Charleston Gunners players
Dafnis B.C. players
Denver Nuggets players
Elitzur Maccabi Netanya B.C. players
Golden State Warriors draft picks
Golden State Warriors players
Hapoel Holon players
Israeli Basketball Premier League players
Levallois Sporting Club Basket players
Liga ACB players
Pallacanestro Virtus Roma players
People from Highland Park, Michigan
Power forwards (basketball)
Quilmes de Mar del Plata basketball players
Rapid City Thrillers players